Saint-Privat-de-Champclos is a commune in the Gard department in the Languedoc-Roussillonin region in southern France. The town of Saint-Privat-de-Champclos is located in the township of Barjac part of the district of Alès. Saint-Privat-de-Champclos has the area code 30293 (also known as code INSEE) and the zip code is 30430.

Area of Saint-Privat-de-Champclos is 11,64 km² and has a population density of 25,26 inhabs/km².

Population

See also
Communes of the Gard department
 Côtes du Vivarais AOC

References

Communes of Gard